Nikola "Nidža" Zorić (Serbian Cyrillic: Никола "Ниџа" Зорић) is a Serbian musician best known as the keyboardist for the Serbian and former Yugoslav rock band Riblja Čorba.

Biography
Nikola Zorić started his career in 1997 with band Kazneni Prostor. Alongside working with the band Zorić became a member of choir Braća Baruh. Kazneni Prostor disbanded in 1999, and Zorić joined Riblja Čorba in 2002 replacing Vlada Barjaktarević.

Nikola Zorić was involved in recording a Children's music choir Horislavci album Ekološka žurka and Tiho noći.

Discography

With Riblja Čorba

Studio albums
Ovde (2003)
Trilogija (2006)
Minut sa njom (2009)
Uzbuna (2012)

Live albums
Gladijatori u BG Areni (2007)
Niko nema ovakve ljude! (2010)

EPs
Trilogija 1: Nevinost bez zaštite (2005)
Trilogija 2: Devičanska ostrva (2006)
Trilogija 3: Ambasadori loše volje (2006)

Various artists albums
Tiho noći (2007)
Horislavci - Ekološka žurka (2007)

References 
 EX YU ROCK enciklopedija 1960-2006,  Janjatović Petar;  

1981 births
Living people
People from Pančevo
Serbian rock keyboardists